D120 is the main state road on island of Mljet in Croatia connecting Mljet National Park and resorts on the island to Sobra and the ferry port in the town, from where Jadrolinija ferries sail to the mainland, docking in Prapratno and the D416 state road.

The road, as well as all other state roads in Croatia, is managed and maintained by Hrvatske ceste, a state-owned company.

Traffic volume 

Traffic is regularly counted and reported by Hrvatske ceste (HC), operator of the road. Substantial variations between annual (AADT) and summer (ASDT) traffic volumes are attributed to the fact that the road connects a number of island resorts to the mainland.

Road junctions and populated areas

Sources

State roads in Croatia
Transport in Dubrovnik-Neretva County
Mljet